The Chagres River, in central Panama, is the largest river in the Panama Canal's watershed. The river is dammed twice, and the resulting reservoirs—Gatun Lake and Lake Alajuela—form an integral part of the canal and its water system. Although the river's natural course runs northwest to its mouth at the Caribbean Sea, its waters also flow, via the canal's locks, into the Gulf of Panama to the south. The Chagres thus has the unusual claim of drainage into two oceans.

Upper Chagres River to Madden Dam
The upper Chagres River, its watershed, and the watershed of several tributaries lie within the Chagres National Park, created in 1985 to preserve the habitat and flow of water into the canal. The terrain of the upper Chagres watershed is rugged, with its mountain slopes exceeding 45 degrees in 90 percent of its territory. Some 98 percent of the park consists of old-growth tropical forest.

The upper Chagres and its seven tributaries flow into Lake Alajuela (formerly Madden Lake), the reservoir created by the Madden Dam. As these rivers contribute 45 percent of the total water for the canal, the lake is an essential part of the watershed of the canal zone. Lake Alajuela is not part of the navigational route, so there are fewer restrictions on its water level than for Gatun Lake. Water from the reservoir is also used to generate hydroelectric power and to supply Panama City's fresh water.

Gatun Dam and Gatun Lake

At  from the river's mouth lies the Gatun Dam, which created Gatun Lake and provides hydroelectricity. Created in 1913 by the damming of the Chagres River, Gatun Lake is an essential part of the Panama Canal, which forms a water passage between the Atlantic Ocean and the Pacific Ocean, permitting ship transit in both directions. The lake is essential to the canal's water supply, as it provides the millions of gallons of water at the high level needed for the locks to function correctly. The lake is also part of the navigational canal and provides drinking water for Panama City and Colon.

At the time it was formed, Gatun Lake was the largest man-made lake in the world. The impassable rainforest around Gatun Lake has been the best defense of the Panama Canal. Today, these areas have endured practically unscathed by human interference and are among the one the few accessible areas where various native Central American animal and plant species can be observed undisturbed in their natural habitat. Barro Colorado Island, which was reserved for scientific study when the lake was formed and is today operated by the Smithsonian Institution, is the largest island on Gatun Lake and renowned internationally. Many of the most important groundbreaking scientific and biological discoveries of the tropical animal and plant kingdom took place here. Eco-tourism on Gatun Lake has become a valuable industry for Panamanians.

Angling is one of the primary recreational pursuits on Gatun Lake. It is believed that the Cichla pleiozona species of peacock bass was introduced by accident to Gatun Lake by a Panamanian aquarist and doctor in 1958. Locally called Sargento, these bass are not a native game fish of Panama but originate from the Amazon, Rio Negro, and Orinoco River basins of South America, where they are called Tucanare or Pavon and are considered a premier game fish. Since 1958, the Cichla pleiozona species has flourished and become the dominant game fish in Gatun Lake. It hits topwater lures, subsurface lures imitating bait fish, and a variety of fly patterns, and when hooked they fight energetically. They are unusual for preferring to feed during daylight hours.

History
The Spanish commander Diego Cueto and his helmsman, Pedro de Umbria, visited the region in 1506. The Chagres River was explored in 1527 by Hernando de la Serna, who founded the town of Chagres at its mouth and built the fortress of San Lorenzo. Goods were transported on foot from Panama City to the town of Cruces on the rio Chagres, and from there by sailboats on the river all the way to its mouth. This path, called Camino de Cruces, was very popular until the 18th century.

The pirate Henry Morgan traveled the Chagres River to attack Panama City in 1670–71.

Not much attention was focused on the river until the late 19th century, this time as part of the planning for construction of the Panama Canal. The Chagres River is the Panama Canal's chief source of water.

The river's upper basin is covered by dense tropical forests. To protect that ecosystem, Panama created Chagres National Park in 1985.

References

Further reading
 The Chagres: River of Westward Passage by John Easter Minter (part of the Rivers of America Series.  Rinehart & Company; 1948)

External links
Gatun Lake

Rivers of Panama
Panama Canal
Panamanian coasts of the Caribbean Sea
Drainage basins of the Pacific Ocean